Spencer Dumaresq Moseley (October 21, 1919 - May 23, 1991) was an American football player.

Moseley was born in 1919 in Evanston, Illinois. He attended the Hill School.   

He played college football for the Yale Bulldogs football team. He was captain of the 1942 Yale Bulldogs football team and was selected by both the United Press and the Newspaper Enterprise Association as an All-American center.  

He was ranked as one of the top 20 players in Yale football history by a committee formed in commemoration of the 100th anniversary of the Harvard-Yale game. He broke his jaw in his second season but played every game wearing a specially designed harness. He graduated with honors from Yale in 1943.

During World War II, Moseley served as a Captain in the Marine Corps Air Division as a pilot in the Second Marine Air Wing. He was married in 1947 at Rye, New York, to Virginia Gillette Kleitz. He later joined REA Express, formerly Railway Express Agency, in 1968 and became its chief executive officer until he retired in the mid-1980s. He died in 1991 at age 72 in Chicago.

His father, George Moseley, was an All-American end at Yale, class of 1917.

References 

1917 births
1991 deaths
Yale Bulldogs football players
American football centers
Players of American football from Illinois
People from Evanston, Illinois
Railway Express Agency
The Hill School alumni